Taj Stansberry (born in Oakland, California, United States) is an American director and photographer, known for his music videos with artists such as Rihanna, J Lo, Usher, Ne-Yo, John Legend, Young Jeezy, Ludacris, Keyshia Cole, Swizz Beatz, Eve, Wale and Big Sean.His video for J Lo's "On the Floor" is the most watched female video of all time on YouTube with over 800,000,000 views. He is currently developing a few feature projects as well.

His unique style and ability to capture an artists' personality has made him one of the most sought after directors in the business.

Biography
Taj is a self-taught photographer turned director.  He started out photographing local rappers and models in Oakland, where he grew up.  He then went on to work as a production assistant for renowned music video director, Anthony Mandler, who motivated Taj to start directing himself. Soon after he signed to his first production company, Boxfresh Pictures. Today he is represented by Triple Seven Productions for Commercials & Music Videos, and Verve Talent & Literary Agency for feature films.

Videography
 Rihanna - Don't Stop the Music
 Jennifer Lopez - On the Floor ft. Pitbull
 Swizz Beatz - Coolin ft Eve
 Usher -  Lil Freak ft. Nicki Minaj
 Jill Scott - So in Love ft. Anthony Hamilton
 Keyshia Cole - Take Me Away
 Kendrick Lamar - Money Trees
 Big Sean - My Last ft. Chris Brown
 Young Jeezy - Lose My Mind ft. Plies
 Ne-Yo - Part of the List
 John Legend ft. Ludacris - Tonight (Best You Ever Had)
 Musiq Soulchild - Beautiful
 Musiq Soulchild - Anything ft. Swizz Beatz
 Shontelle - Impossible
 Ludacris - My Chick Bad ft Nicki Minaj
 Ludacris - My Chick Bad Remix ft Diamond, Trina and Eve
 Shyne - The Original
 Ray J - Last Wish
 Eve - She Bad Bad
 Fabolous - So NY
 Fabolous - Ready
 Jennifer Lopez - Actin' Like That ft. Iggy Azalea
 G-Eazy - Me, Myself & I ft. Bebe Rexha

References

External links

American music video directors
Living people
Year of birth missing (living people)